Glipa maruyamai is a species of beetle in the genus Glipa. It was described in 2000.

References

maruyamai
Beetles described in 2000